Women have served in the Canadian Senate since Senator Cairine Wilson was first appointed to the Senate by the government of Prime Minister William Lyon Mackenzie King in 1930. Since then, women have represented every province and territory in the Senate except for Nunavut.

Appointed before 1993

Since 1993

Current

See qlso 
List of women elected to Canadian Parliament

References 

Lists of members of the Senate of Canada
Senate
Canada, Senate
Senate